Ekari may refer to:
Ekari people, a people of the Indonesian province of Papua 
Ekari language, the language of the Ekari people